is one of the twelve constriction techniques of Kodokan Judo in the Shime-waza list.

Technique description 
Graphic
from
http://www.judoinfo.com/techdrw.htm

Exemplar videos:

Technique history

Included systems 
Systems:
Kodokan Judo, Judo Lists
Lists
The Canon Of Judo
Judo technique

Similar techniques, variants, and aliases 
Aliases:
Thrust choke 
Variants:
Necktie jime

Judo technique